Julie Fowlis is a folk music singer-songwriter and multi-instrumentalist from Scotland.

BBC Radio 2 Folk Awards
The BBC Radio 2 Folk Awards celebrate outstanding achievement within the field of folk music. Fowlis has received two awards from three nominations.

Festival Interceltique de Lorient
The Festival Interceltique de Lorient is an annual Celtic music festival in France. Fowlis has received one award from one nomination.

Great Scot of the Year Awards
The Great Scot of the Year Awards recognize the achievements of Scottish people from a variety of fields including music, business and sport. Fowlis has been nominated once.

Hancock Awards
The Hancock Awards, named after Carey "Ces' Hancock, are awards for folk music singers and composers. Fowlis has received one award from one nomination.

Pan Celtic Festival
The Pan Celtic Festival is held annually in Ireland to promote Celtic languages and cultures. Fowlis has received one award from one nomination.

Royal National Mòd
The Royal National Mòd is an annual festival featuring Gaelic music, art and culture in Scotland. Fowlis has received one award from one nomination.

Scots Trad Music Awards
The Scots Trad Music Awards were created in 2003 by Hands Up for Trad to recognize and honour musicians who perform traditional Scottish music. Fowlis has received five awards from eight nominations.

Spirit of Scotland Awards
The Spirit of Scotland Awards, sponsored by Glenfiddich, is an annual prize awarded to notable Scottish people. Fowlis has received one award from one nomination.

Other recognitions
 2010 – Fowlis was named ambassador of the Hebridean Celtic Festival and inducted into its Hall of Fame.
 2012 – Fowlis was included in The Herald's list of "Scotland's Top 50 Influential Women of 2012".

Notes

References

Fowlis, Julie